The Custos Rotulorum of Tyrone was the highest civil officer in County Tyrone, Ireland. The position was later combined with that of Lord Lieutenant of Tyrone.

Incumbents

1661–1671 William Caulfeild, 1st Viscount Charlemont (also Custos Rotulorum of County Armagh)
1692–? William Caulfeild, 2nd Viscount Charlemont (died 1726)  (also Custos Rotulorum of County Armagh)
c.1790–1818 Thomas Knox, 1st Viscount Northland
 1819–1841 Somerset Lowry-Corry, 2nd Earl Belmore 

For later custodes rotulorum, see Lord Lieutenant of Tyrone

References

Tyrone